This is a list of the weekly Canadian RPM magazine number one Top Singles chart of 1971.

See also
1971 in music

List of Billboard Hot 100 number ones of 1971
List of Cashbox Top 100 number-one singles of 1971

References
Notes

External links
 Read about RPM Magazine at the AV Trust
 Search RPM charts here at Library and Archives Canada

1971 in Canadian music
Canada Singles
1971